Schlink is a German surname. Notable people with the surname include:

Bernhard Schlink, German jurist and writer 
Basilea Schlink, German religious leader and writer
Edmund Schlink, German Lutheran theologian 
Frederick J. Schlink, American consumer rights activist 

German-language surnames